James Entwistle Luff (9 May 1887 – 5 October 1960) was an Australian rules footballer who played with Fitzroy in the Victorian Football League (VFL).

Notes

External links 

1887 births
1960 deaths
Australian rules footballers from Victoria (Australia)
Fitzroy Football Club players